Scopula albomaculata is a moth of the family Geometridae. It was described by Frederic Moore in 1888. It is found in northern India.

References

Moths described in 1888
albomaculata
Moths of Asia
Taxa named by Frederic Moore